Hand of Fate or Hands of Fate may refer to:

Music 

 Hand of Fate (Amanda Perez album)
 "Hand of Fate", a song from the Rolling Stones' 1976 album Black and Blue
 "Hand of Fate", a single by American band Sons of the Desert
 Hands of Fate, an album by the heavy metal band Savage Messiah
 "Hand of Fate", a track on the soundtrack of the 2002 film, Signs
“hand of fate” by Shiro Sagisu used on Evangelion: 3.0 + 1.0 (Thrice Upon a Time)

Films 

 Manos: The Hands of Fate, a 1966 independent horror film
 Praesten i Vejlby (1922 film), also known as The Hand of Fate
 Hand of Fate (film), 2013 Gambian film

Video games 

 Hand of Fate (video game), a 2015 action-RPG
 Manos: The Hands of Fate (video game), a 2012 game based on a film of the same name
 The Legend of Kyrandia: The Hand of Fate, a 1993 adventure game

Other uses 

 Die glückliche Hand, an opera by Arnold Schoenberg
 Hand of Fate, a spell in the 4th edition of the Dungeons & Dragons tabletop RPG
 Hand of Fate, a virtual reality item in an episode of the animated television series Batman: The Animated Series